Adaina parainvida is a moth of the family Pterophoridae. It is found in Costa Rica and on Jamaica.

The wingspan is 11–13 mm. The head is scaled and ochreous-white. The antennae are ochreous-white. The thorax, tegulae and mesothorax are ochreous-white with a distinct brown margin along the abdominal junction. The abdomen is ochreous-white, with a distinct dark dorsal blackish spot on the fifth segment. The forewings are ochreous-white, with a diffuse brown scaling and grey-brown fringes with dark brown patches at the anal regions. The underside is grey-brown with faint brown scales. The hindwings are greyish with grey-brown fringes. The underside is grey-brown.

Adults have been recorded in July.

Etymology
The species is called parainvida because of the resemblance in the male genitalia
to Adaina invida.

References

Moths described in 1992
Oidaematophorini